Drew Bundini Brown (March 21, 1928 – September 24, 1987) was an assistant trainer and cornerman of heavyweight champion boxer Muhammad Ali.

Early life
Brown, who was born in Midway, Florida, and raised in nearby Sanford, dropped out of junior high school after the eighth grade. The strapping young Brown, who had matured rapidly during puberty, was able to lie about his age and join the United States Navy as a Messboy at age 13. Discharged two years later, he found employment as a United States Merchant Marine, and spent 12 years traveling the world on the high seas.

Career 

After seven years with Sugar Ray Robinson, widely recognized as one of the best boxers of all time, Brown joined Muhammad Ali's boxing team as a cornerman in 1963. and remained with him throughout his career. (Later he also became a cornerman for James "Quick" Tillis).

Brown was one of Ali's speech writers. He wrote certain poems, including that which coined Ali's famous and oft quoted: “Float like a butterfly, sting like a bee, rumble, young man, rumble.” Ali used the poem to taunt Sonny Liston at the press conference prior to his February 25, 1964, victory over the WBA and WBC champion to claim both titles.

Death
Brown died on 24 September 1987 in Los Angeles County, California at the age of 59 from medical complications of injuries sustained in a previous car accident. He pinched a nerve in his spine in the crash and subsequently suffered a serious fall at home, from which he never recovered. He was visited by Ali on his deathbed. His body was buried at Page Jackson Cemetery, in Sanford, Florida.

Personal life 

Brown had one brother, Elbert James Brown. In the early 1950s, while living in Harlem, New York City, Brown married Rhoda Palestine, whose family was Russian-Jewish. Due to this relationship, Brown later converted to Reform Judaism. They married at a time when interracial relationships and marriages were considered by many as taboo, and had one son, Drew Brown III (born January 20, 1955, in Harlem).

According to the autobiography of singer Ruth Brown (no relation), he was also the true father of her son Ronald David Jackson (“Ronnie”), though he was unaware of this during the boy’s childhood.

His son Drew III joined the United States Navy and became a Medium Attack Bomber pilot flying the A-6 Intruder. After retiring from the Navy, he wrote a bestselling book, You Gotta Believe, and became a nationally known speaker.

Portrayals in film
He was played by the actor Bernie Mac in the film Don King: Only in America, and by Jamie Foxx in the film Ali and by Lawrence Gilliard Jr. in One Night In Miami.

Filmography

As actor
Shaft (1971) .... Willy
Shaft's Big Score! (1972) .... Willy
Aaron Loves Angela (1975) .... Referee
The Color Purple (1985) .... Jook Joint Patron
Penitentiary III (1987) .... Sugg / Inmate #2 (final film role)

As self
Am laufenden Band (1976, 1 TV episode, dated 22 May 1976 .... Himself
The Greatest (1977) .... Himself
Muhammad and Larry (1980) .... Himself
Doin' Time (1985) .... Himself (special appearance)
When We Were Kings (1996) .... Himself (uncredited)

Archive footage
A.K.A. Cassius Clay (1970) .... Himself
Beat This!: A Hip hop History (1984, TV) .... Himself

Mohammad Ali- Round one: the greatest (1942-1964)….himself 2021

References

External links

1928 births
1987 deaths
African-American Jews
African-American male actors
American boxing trainers
American male film actors
American sailors
American Reform Jews
Converts to Reform Judaism
Jewish American male actors
Jewish American sportspeople
People from Sanford, Florida
20th-century American male actors
United States Navy officers
United States Navy personnel of World War II
Road incident deaths in California
African Americans in World War II
20th-century American Jews
20th-century African-American sportspeople